Sir William Benjamin Bowring Gammell FRSE (born 29 December 1952) is a Scottish businessman and former Scotland international rugby union player.

Early life

Gammell was born in Edinburgh, and was the son of an investment banker, who was invited at an early age to join Edinburgh's Ivory & Sime (which was started in the late 1800s with the formation of the British Assets Trust.) 

Gammell attended Fettes College, an independent school in Edinburgh where he was friends and debating partners with future British Prime Minister Tony Blair. The two have remained close friends.  After Fettes, Gammell attended the University of Stirling where he obtained a BA in Economics and Accountancy.

Rugby Union career

Amateur career

He played for Edinburgh Wanderers.

Provincial career

He played for Edinburgh District.

International career

He was capped by Scotland 'B' to play France 'B' in 1976 and 1977.

He then was given a full senior cap for Scotland in 1977.  He went on to earn five international caps in total. He scored two tries on his debut, against Ireland at Murrayfield in 1977,and played against Japan in 1977 in Tokyo when he scored four tries in the Scots' 74–9 victory.

Business career

After his rugby career was ended by injury, Gammell followed his father into business.  Using venture capital, he founded Cairn Energy in Edinburgh.  The company invested in several unsuccessful oilfields in the United States before making a modest strike in the Pennsylvania oilfield. Gammell was appointed Cairn's Chief Executive on its initial listing in 1989. 

In the mid-1990s, he led the company in a radical reallocation of its assets, moving out of US and North Sea oil and gas concerns and into neglected fields in South Asia. The company's fortunes soared in 2004, when a field it had bought in 2001 (for $7.5 million) from Shell in the Indian province of Rajasthan was found to contain close to 1.1 billion barrels of oil, catapulting it into the FTSE 100.

Gammell was paid an annual salary of £552,000 for his role as chief executive at Cairn Energy.  On 1 July 2011 Gammell assumed the role of non-executive chairman.

Gammell's father invested in US oil company Bush-Overbey, owned by future US President George H. W. Bush. The two families became friends, with George W. Bush spending the summer at the Gammells' farm in Scotland, and attending Gammell's wedding in Glasgow in 1983.  The two have remained close friends.  When George W. Bush assumed the Presidency, both he and Blair reportedly called their mutual friend Gammell to ask his opinion of the other.

Gammell is a director of the Scottish Institute of Sport and Artemis AiM VCT plc., and in 2004 he was awarded UK Entrepreneur of the Year. In the 2006 New Year Honours list, Gammell was made a Knight Bachelor "for services to Industry in Scotland", and in 2017 he was elected a Fellow of the Royal Society of Edinburgh.

In 2005, Gammell founded Winning Scotland, a charity that builds confidence and resilience in young people. It was initially named The Scottish Institute of Sport Foundation before changing its name to Winning Scotland Foundation in 2008. They rebranded as Winning Scotland in 2021. Gammell has been the chairman of Winning Scotland since 2013.

Gammell received an Honorary Doctorate from Heriot-Watt University in 2007 

In 2011, he was also awarded the Honorary Degree of Doctor of Business Administration by Robert Gordon University.

References

External links 
 Bill Gammell on the Sporting Heroes database
 Gammell strikes oil at EoY
 Forbes report on Gammell and Cairn

1952 births
Living people
Rugby union players from Edinburgh
People educated at Fettes College
Alumni of the University of Stirling
Scottish businesspeople
Scottish rugby union players
Rugby union wings
Knights Bachelor
Scotland international rugby union players
Edinburgh Wanderers RFC players
Scotland 'B' international rugby union players
Edinburgh District (rugby union) players